Lipovník may refer to:
 Lipovník, Topoľčany District, Slovakia
 Lipovník, Rožňava District, Slovakia